The 1973 All-Ireland Intermediate Hurling Championship was the 13th staging of the All-Ireland hurling championship. The championship ended on 16 September 1973.

Tipperary were the defending champions, however, they did not field a team in the championship. Kilkenny won the title after defeating London by 5–15 to 2–9 in the final.

References

Intermediate
All-Ireland Intermediate Hurling Championship